Lake Arreo, also known as the Caicedo-Yuso Lake is a lake in the province of Álava, Basque Country, Spain.

Flora and fauna
Hydrophytes found within the lake itself include Myriophyllum verticillatum, M. spicatum, Ceratophyllum submersum, Potamogeton pectinatus, P. coloratus, P. gramineus, P. nodosus, P. pusillus, P. lucens, Ranunculus trichophyllus, R. peltatus baudoti, Polygonum amphibium and Utricularia australis. The shallow shores of the lake are home to plants species including Schoenoplectus lacustris, common reed, Typha angustifolia, Cladium mariscus. Due to the existence of a salt spring near the lake, species found in saline areas such as Juncus acutus, Juncus gerardi, Spergularia marina, Parapholis incurvaand Plantago coronopus are also present.

Mallards, Eurasian coots and great crested grebes have been observed at the site. Only the tench is autochthonous; while the largemouth bass, Eurasian carp and the pumpkinseed are introduced.

References

External links
 

Arreo
Natura 2000 in the Basque Country (autonomous community)
Ramsar sites in Spain
Protected areas established in 2002
Protected areas of the Basque Country (autonomous community)
Wetlands of the Basque Country (autonomous community)